QLC or qlc may refer to:

Science and technology
 Quad-level cell, a type of flash memory
 Quark–lepton complementarity, a possible fundamental symmetry between quarks and leptons
 .QLC, a file extension for ATM Type 1 fonts script; See List of filename extensions (M–R)
 Quantum logic clock

Other uses
 Bedford QLC, a variant of the Bedford QL series of trucks
 Quaid-e-Azam Law College, a private law college in Pakistan
 Osage language (Linguist List code: qlc)
 Kansa language (Linguist List code: qlc)

See also

 
 Quasi-linear convective system (QLCS), a line of thunderstorms